George Chapman (2 July 1909 – 10 December 1980) was an  Australian rules footballer who played with St Kilda in the Victorian Football League (VFL) and Port Adelaide in the South Australian National Football League (SANFL).

Notes

External links 

1909 births
1980 deaths
Australian rules footballers from South Australia
St Kilda Football Club players
Port Adelaide Football Club (SANFL) players
Port Adelaide Football Club players (all competitions)